The Burmese shrike (Lanius collurioides) is a species of bird in the family Laniidae.
It is found in Bangladesh, Cambodia, China, India, Laos, Myanmar, Thailand, and Vietnam.
Its natural habitats are subtropical or tropical moist lowland forest and subtropical or tropical moist montane forest.

References

Burmese shrike
Birds of Myanmar
Birds of Southeast Asia
Birds of South China
Burmese shrike
Taxonomy articles created by Polbot